Kuranda may refer to:

Places
 Kuranda, Queensland, a town on the Atherton Tableland in Far North Queensland, Australia
 Kuranda Butterfly Farm, the Australian Butterfly Sanctuary, situated in the centre of Kuranda Village
 Kuranda Fig Tree Avenue
 Kuranda Range Highway
 Kuranda Range road
 Kuranda Scenic Railway, a railway line runs from Cairns, Queensland, Australia to the nearby town of Kuranda
 Kuranda Skyrail, another name for the Skyrail Rainforest Cableway
 Kuranda, Russia, a village in Malzhagarsky Rural Okrug of Olyokminsky District of the Sakha Republic

Other uses
 Kuranda (surname)

See also
 Kaludah, ferry launched in Australia in 1908 as Kuranda
 Xyroptila kuranda, a moth of the family Pterophoridae, found in southern Sulawesi and Australia